Ralph Sneyd (1793–1870) was an English landowner in Staffordshire, now best known for the rebuilding of Keele Hall. He was also an ironmaster, coalowner and railway developer, and was High Sheriff of Staffordshire in 1844.

Early life
He was educated at Eton College. During the early part of the Napoleonic Wars, his father was an officer in the Staffordshire Militia, from 1805 the King's Own (1st Staffordshire) Militia, a name it received from George III of the United Kingdom who showed a high regard for this unit which had the task of guarding his residences. Lord Ronald Gower wrote:

Mr. Sneyd had been a great courtier when he was a boy at Eton. His parents lived at Windsor when his father was attached to the court. George III. had given him a Latin Grammar, and he was quite an ardent admirer of that Monarch.

Sneyd matriculated at Christ Church, Oxford in 1811. A friend from school and college days was John FitzGibbon, 2nd Earl of Clare, with whom Sneyd kept up a long and active correspondence. Sarah Wedgwood, widow of Josiah Wedgwood, encountered Sneyd socially in 1813, and wrote in a letter

 We had a good deal of literary conversation, as Mr Sneyd has a very pretty smattering of literary topics and a good deal of taste, though a little affected [...]

In 1817, Harriet Leveson-Gower, Countess Granville wrote to Georgiana Morpeth that "Ralph Sneyd is very entertaining. He has drawn me a head of Rogers upon the body of a wasp that is the best thing I ever saw."

His father was unconvinced of the wisdom of the move, and in the end Sir John Wrottesley was elected unopposed. In  in the 1826 general election, Sneyd did stand in a tight politically-complex contest, with the backing of local independents Christopher Flood and Philip Mules. He came third in the two-member constituency, to John Josiah Guest and Harry Baines Lott. At this period his friends George Agar-Ellis and George Mathew Fortescue were both in parliament, with more liberal views. Sneyd did, however, favour Catholic emancipation.

Landowner

Sneyd inherited the Keele Hall estate from his father in 1829. Walter Sneyd had brought down a heavy burden of encumbering debt on the land from the beginning of the 19th century. Ralph brought in Edward Blore to work on buildings that are now part of Keele University, in 1830–1833. He developed the garden from about 1830, planting on a large scale, and was noted particularly for his use of crosses of Rhododendron arboreum. He brought in William Sawrey Gilpin from the start to advise on his gardens, as he wrote to Agar-Ellis in September 1829.

He commented on the Tory trio, made up by Lord Sandon and Sir Charles Bagot, of "most highly cultivated and refined companions".

The land of the village of Keele was all in his hands by 1841, and he embarked there on building, displaying a monogram RS on works. He went into business mining coal, but without financial success. The death in 1848 of his agent Samuel Peake revealed poor administration of the coal company, which supplied Sneyd's ironworks at Knutton Heath, and a fresh start was made for the Silverdale Colliery.

In 1848 Sneyd on the recommendation of Charles Arbuthnot hired Andrew Thompson to run his estate, who over the following 21 years introduced improved farming methods. Mid-century, he spent on "seeding down" — the process of investing in turf better for cattle grazing — by providing seeds to his tenants. He also backed out of active management of business, as an ironmaster. In 1848 he leased to Francis Stanier the older (died 1856), a solicitor of Newcastle-under-Lyme, his coal mines and ironworks. Stanier went on to develop them at Apedale, Knutton and Silverdale. Sneyd as landlord built a private railway line from Silverdale to Newcastle, in 1849. Then in 1852 the North Staffordshire Railway built a line that made a junction with Sneyd's at Knutton.

Sneyd had Anthony Salvin remodel Keele Hall over the period 1854–1860, a well-regarded conversion in line with Sneyd's bachelor tastes. In 1858 he recommended Wheatstone's House Telegraph to a friend.

Collector
Sneyd was a client of the antique furniture dealer Edward Holmes Baldock of London. He bought around 1835 an annotated copy of Johnson's Dictionary, a sought-after first edition that later went via Maggs Bros Ltd to the collector Richard Gimbel. At the Strawberry Hill House sale in 1842, he bought Horace Walpole's copy of William Maitland's History of Edinburgh. He was a keen collector of manuscripts.

In common with Lord Francis Egerton and Richard Ford, Sneyd used the art dealer Alessandro Aducci in Rome.

Legacy
Sneyd was unmarried, and on his death, the Keele Hall estate passed to his brother Walter; and then to his nephew Ralph Sneyd (1863–1949). The Hall was rented by Grand Duke Michael Mikhailovich of Russia from 1901 to 1910.

The Keele Hall library was put up for auction in 1903, as Walter Sneyd's collection of illuminated manuscripts and early printed books. Many of the manuscripts passed to Charles Fairfax Murray. The Johnson's Dictionary came up for sale in 1927.

Notes

1793 births
1870 deaths
English landowners
English collectors